is a former Japanese football player.

Playing career
Ota was born in Kyoto Prefecture on April 28, 1970. After graduating from Doshisha University, he joined JEF United Ichihara in 1993. Although he played several matches as goalkeeper from first season, he could not play many matches behind Kenichi Shimokawa. In 1995, he moved to Urawa Reds. However he could not play at all in the match behind Hisashi Tsuchida and Yuki Takita. He retired end of 1997 season.

Club statistics

References

External links

1970 births
Living people
Doshisha University alumni
Association football people from Kyoto Prefecture
Japanese footballers
J1 League players
JEF United Chiba players
Urawa Red Diamonds players
Association football goalkeepers